6R may refer to :
 Ford 6R transmission, a 2006 6-speed automatic transmission
 Kawasaki Ninja ZX-6R, a 1995 middleweight sport bike
 Ponceau 6R, a red azo dye
 Yaesu VX-6R, a triple band handheld amateur radio transceiver 
 A standard consumer print size for photographs. See Standard photographic print sizes.
6R, the production code for the 1984 Doctor Who serial The Caves of Androzani

See also
R6 (disambiguation)